Deas Island is a peninsula in the south arm of the Fraser River between Delta, British Columbia and Richmond, British Columbia, Canada. It is home to three historic buildings; Burrvilla, a stately Victorian home, Inverholme, a one-room schoolhouse, and the Delta Agricultural Hall. Between 1895-1940's, the peninsula had a small Greek settlement with the population being approximately 80 at its peak.

The peninsula is also home to many types of birds and is a popular bird watching destination.

The peninsula is notable for being the site of the southern end of the George Massey Tunnel (originally the Deas Island Tunnel). The tunnel is part of Highway 99 and connects Delta to Richmond. The tunnel goes from Deas Island to Lulu Island (Richmond) to the north. There is a small bridge that completes the connection between Deas Island and the main part of Delta.

Origin of the name
The peninsula was named for John Sullivan Deas, an African-Canadian tinsmith who established a cannery on the peninsula in 1873. His was the leading cannery on the Fraser River until 1878, at which point growing competition encouraged Deas to sell.

References
Metro Vancouver Parks Page
Various Pictures

Islands of British Columbia
Delta, British Columbia
Islands of the Fraser River
Former islands of Canada